Hans Hermann Neuberger (1910–1996) was head of Pennsylvania State University's Department of Meteorology.

Early life 
On 17 February 1910, Hans Hermann Neuberger was born in Mannheim, Germany.

Education 
In 1936, Neuberger received a doctorate from the University of Hamburg in Hamburg, Germany. In 1937, Neuberger emigrated to the United States.

Career 
Neuberger started his career as an instructor of geophysics at Pennsylvania State College. Neuberger's skills in the creation and use of instrumentation were notable; he designed a polarimeter. In 1970, Neuberger retired but continued to teach at the University of South Florida.

In 1972, Penn State established the Hans Neuberger teaching award to honor Neuberger. It is given to its top teaching assistants for teaching meteorology at the elementary level.

Personal life 
On January 13, 1996, Neuberger died in Sun City Center, Florida. Neuberger was 85.

References

External links 
 Hans H. Neuberger Papers (1929-1988) - Collection #1076.

1910 births
1996 deaths
American meteorologists
German meteorologists
Pennsylvania State University faculty
University of Hamburg alumni
German emigrants to the United States